The Quneitra offensive (October 2015) was launched by Syrian rebel forces, during the Syrian Civil War, in order to capture government-held positions in Quneitra Governorate at: Tall Ahmar, UN hill, Madinat al-Baath and Khan Arnabah. The objective was to break the government siege of Western Ghouta.

The offensive

On 4 October, rebels of the Free Syrian Army captured Tall Ahmar after two days of fighting. One of the leaders of the operation was killed during the battle. The Army backed by pro-government militia launched a counter-attack on the hill but was repelled.

On 10 October, rebels captured the "UN hill" and resumed their offensive against Tal Qaba’a. The next day, the Army allegedly managed to recapture the hill. Two days later, the military recaptured Tall Ahmar as well, thus reversing all of the rebel's gains. Government forces also advanced in the area of al-Amal farms. That day, the IDF shelled Syrian Army posts after two rockets landed on the Israeli-occupied part of the Golan Heights.

On 24 October, government forces recaptured the 4th Battalion base, reversing all rebel gains since the start of the offensive.

See also
 2014 Quneitra offensive
 Quneitra Governorate clashes (2012–14)
 Battle of Nasib Border Crossing
 Battle of Bosra (2015)

References

Military operations of the Syrian civil war in 2015
Quneitra Governorate in the Syrian civil war
Military operations of the Syrian civil war involving the Syrian government
Military operations of the Syrian civil war involving the al-Nusra Front